Paul Sanders, MA (Paris IV), DEA (Sciences Po Paris), PhD (Cambridge), born 23 September 1967 in Banbury, UK, is an Anglo-German historian and leadership scholar. He is a full-time professor in the Department of Strategy at NEOMA Business School, Reims, France. His teaching interests lie in the areas of leadership, ethics and international affairs, and he is a media commentator on Russian and European affairs.

Monographs

The Channel Islands Occupation, 1940–1945
In his thematic history The British Channel Islands under German Occupation 1940–1945 (2005) Sanders covers all aspects of the occupation experience, including economics and ethics. This official commission followed upon a previous publication on the occupation of Jersey, titled The Ultimate Sacrifice (1998). This book's findings were the basis of the honouring of Channel Islanders Louisa Gould, Harold Le Druillenec and Ivy Forster with a posthumous 'British Heroes of the Holocaust' award, in 2010.

References

External links

HISTORY, LEADERSHIP AND ETHICS
 'Who doesn't have a dog hunts like a cat' – Strategic path setting, leadership and the ethics of British bombing in World War II, International Studying Leadership Conference, December 2016, Edinburgh
 'The ‘strange Mr Kastner’ – Leadership ethics in Holocaust-era Hungary, in the light of grey zones and dirty hands', Leadership, Sage journals, 2015
 'Article on Victory/Liberation Day 2014, Bloomsbury History blog'
 'Legitimacy, social capital and ‘dirty hands’ – A three-constituent approach to ethical leadership under duress', International Studying Leadership Conference, December 2013, Rome, Italy
 Protest, Defiance and Resistance in the Channel Islands, 1940–45, Bloomsbury, June 2014 (with G. Carr & L. Willmot)
 Review of Alain Michel's 'Vichy and the Shoah', November 2013
 'Occupied islands in a new light', Jersey Evening Post, 13 March 2010
 Ceremony honouring 'British Heroes of the Holocaust', 10 Downing Street, 9 March 2010
 The British Channel Islands under German Occupation 1940–45, full online-text version
 Managing Under Duress: Ethical Leadership, Social Capital and the Civilian Administration of the British Channel Islands During the Nazi Occupation, 1940–1945, Journal of business ethics, Aug. 2010
 Review of The British Channel Islands under German Occupation 1940–45, by Ryan Holte, H-Net, December 2008
 The Ultimate Sacrifice, full online-text version
 BBC, Russian Service, Историк: на островах в Ла-Манше работали советские пленные, 8 May 2009
 BBC News, Review of The British Channel Islands under German Occupation 1940–45, 'No collaboration choice says book', 6 May 2005
 A New Chapter in Occupation History, Heritage Magazine, Spring 2005
 Isabella Matauschek, Web-Rezension zu Holocaust Memorial Day and Channel Islands Occupation Memorial, H-Soz-u-Kult, 29 January 2005

INTERNATIONAL AND RUSSIAN AFFAIRS
 Huffington Post Article on New Year's Eve events in Cologne, January 2016
 RIA Novosti interview on US-India relations, October 2014
 'Don't let the Ukraine crisis screw your mind', Les Yeux du Monde, May 2014
 'The Idiosyncrasies of Luxury Consumption in Russia' (with P. Tsimakhovich), Luxury Brands in Emerging Markets, edited by G. Atwal & D. Bryson, Palgrave Macmillan, March 2014
 'Entretien sur les JO de Sotchi', Atlantico, Juli 2013
 'Under Western Eyes. How meta-narrative shapes our perception of Russia – and why it is time for a qualitative shift', Transit Online, June 2013
 'Is CSR cognizant of the conflictuality of globalisation? A realist critique', Critical perspectives on international business, May 2012
 De la place Tahrir à Benghazi…en passant par Sarajevo : Trois leçons du printemps arabe, CEREN working papers, 35, summer 2011'
 Русская Служба Новостей | Гости | Пол Сандерс, 2 March 2011
 Пол Сандерс: "Возможности влияния России на Европу сильно преувеличены",Yaroslavl Global Policy Forum, 2010
 'La Russie et la Chine face aux sanctions économiques contre la République islamique d'Iran', LeMonde.fr, 4 May 2010 (with Djamchid Assadi), Russian version: Россия, Китай и экономические санкции против Ирана
 'Rules of engagement: EU-Russia relations and international ethics', ISA Convention, Feb. 2010
 'Russische Direktinvestitionen in der EU – Wahrnehmung, Realität und Herausforderung', Jan.-Feb. 2010 Part 1 Part 2
 'Russia, Iran and the West after the August 2008 war', 2009 (in French)
 Globalization, economic interpenetration and business ethics in emerging markets', June 2009
 'Torheit und Pragmatik: Krieg im Kaukasus', 25 Sept. 2008
 'Wie notwendig ist eine Kehrtwende im europäischen Russlandbild?', Jan. 2008, French version: 'Plaidoyer pour un nouveau partenariat Europe-Russie'
 "Foreign retail groups in Russia – The limits of development", paper presented at IXth International Academic Conference on Economic Modernization and Globalization, Moscow, Higher School of Economics, April 1–3, 2008
 Large-Scale Retailing in Russia – The Outlook for Foreign Groups', Le Courrier des pays de l'Est, no. 1063, Sept.-Oct. 2007

BLACK MARKET AND ILLEGAL ECONOMY
 'Paul Sanders parle de la corruption en Russie', CapCampus, January 2011
 'La Russie et WikiLeaks : retour sur un état mafieux', LeMonde.fr, 14 December 2010, Russian version: WikiLeaks и Россия: снова о "мафиозном государстве"
 Vadim Volkov, violence management and the problem of credible commitment in Russia, CEREN working papers, 28, autumn 2009'
 'Economic draining – German black market operations in France, 1940–1944', Global Crime, vol. 9 (1&2), Feb. 2008
 Review of Histoire du marche noir, 1940–1946 by Hervé Le Bot, 2002, 229–232
 Review of Histoire du marche noir, 1940–1946 by Dominique Veillon, Vingtième Siècle, 76, Oct.- Dec. 2002, 168–169
 Review of Histoire du marché noir 1940–46 by Jean-Paul Hamelin, Marianne, 7 Jan 2002
 Review of Histoire du marché noir 1940–46, LeTemps.ch, 'Plongée dans la guerre secrète du marché noir', 2 March 2002
 Review of The Occupation, the French State, and Business, Olivier Dard, Jean-Claude Daumas, and François Marcot (edd.), by Donald Reid, Business History Review, Harvard Business School, Spring 2002
 Economic choice in dark times – The Vichy economy by Kenneth Mouré, University of California at Santa Barbara
 [https://books.google.com/books?id=uIRmaM0ld1QC&pg=PA11&lpg=PA11&dq=Paul+Sanders%2BCopenhagen%2Boccupation&source=bl&ots=B0bmrA22ZC&sig=Tw5J6LZrXv0Zpu2mW3lBJ8r82NI&hl=en&ei=9Tb4SaOvGt2QjAehx_zRDA&sa=X&oi=book_result&ct=result&resnum=3#PPA157,M1 The German Occupation of Byelorussia 1941–44', in Joachim Lund (ed.), Working for the New Order, 2006'']OTHER'''
 'Le fabuleux procès d’« Amélie de Seattle »', LesEchos.fr, 19 October 2011
 Research Methodology, workshop at Belarusian State University, 2002

English historians
Historians of Germany
Fellows of the Royal Historical Society
People from Banbury
1967 births
Living people
English male non-fiction writers